Alex Gartner is an American film producer. Presently, he is a producer with Atlas Entertainment. He was a part of the convoluted, decade-long quest to film Triple Frontier. Formerly, he was a production executive at MGM and Mosaic Media Group.

Filmography

References

American film producers
Year of birth missing (living people)
Living people